Battling with Buffalo Bill is a 1931 American pre-Code Western serial film directed by Ray Taylor and starring Tom Tyler, Lucile Browne, William Desmond, Rex Bell, and Francis Ford.

Based on the book The Great West That Was by William F. "Buffalo Bill" Cody, the film is about a cowboy named Buffalo Bill who goes up against a shady gambler who is attempting to scare off the townspeople so he can gain possession of a gold strike. When a nearby Indian tribe is provoked into attacking the town, the cavalry rides in to the rescue. Cody's book was also used as the inspiration for the studio's highly successful 1930 serial The Indians Are Coming.
Battling with Buffalo Bill was Universal Pictures's 78th serial, the 10th with sound and 4th with full sound, of the studio's total of 137 serials.

Plot
The plot is a variation on the standard B-Western "Land Grab" plot: Gold has been discovered in the area and gambler Jim Rodney intends to make sole claim to it by pushing the rightful owners off the land and taking it for himself. To do so he has his henchmen kill an Indian woman, provoking attacks from her tribe. This brings Buffalo Bill and the United States Cavalry into the town. Buffalo Bill proceeds to defeat Rodney and his schemes.

Cast
Tom Tyler as William "Buffalo Bill" Cody
Lucile Browne as Jane Mills, Buffalo Bill's love interest
William Desmond as John Mills
Rex Bell as Dave Archer, Buffalo Bill's sidekick.
Francis Ford as Jim Rodney, villainous gambler trying to illicitly claim a local gold strike
George Regas as 'Breed' Johns
Yakima Canutt as Scout Jack Brady
Bud Osborne as Joe Tampas, one of Rodney's henchmen
Joe Bonomo as Joe Brady
Jim Thorpe as Swift Arrow

Production
Along with the more successful The Indians Are Coming (1930) this serial was based on the book "The Great West That Was" by Buffalo Bill Cody.

Stunts
 Joe Bonomo
 Yakima Canutt
 Cliff Lyons

Chapter titles
 Captured by Redskins
 Circling Death
 Between Hostile Tribes
 The Savage Horde
 The Fatal Plunge
 Trapped
 The Unseen Killer
 Sentenced to Death
 The Death Trap
 A Shot from Ambush
 The Flaming Death
 Cheyenne Vengeance
Source:

See also
 List of American films of 1931
 List of film serials by year
 List of film serials by studio

References

External links
 
 
 
 

1931 films
1931 Western (genre) films
American black-and-white films
Cultural depictions of Buffalo Bill
1930s English-language films
Universal Pictures film serials
Films directed by Ray Taylor
American Western (genre) films
1930s American films